Anders Rydberg (3 March 1903 – 26 October 1989) was a Swedish football goalkeeper who played for IFK Göteborg. He represented Team Sweden in the 1934 FIFA World Cup in Italy.

References

External links
FIFA profile

1903 births
1989 deaths
Swedish footballers
Sweden international footballers
Association football goalkeepers
IFK Göteborg players
1934 FIFA World Cup players